2019 Basketball Champions League Final was the concluding game of the 2018–19 Basketball Champions League season, the 3rd season of FIBA's premier basketball league in Europe. The final and the Final Four were played in the Sportpaleis in Antwerp, Belgium. The game was held 5 May 2019.

Virtus Bologna from Italy won its first BCL title and its first European title in ten years. Canarias played in its second final and finished second.

Background

Virtus Bologna
Virtus' 2018–19 season began with the appointment of Alessandro Dalla Salda as new club's CEO and the hire of Stefano Sacripanti as new head coach. Aradori and Filippo Baldi Rossi were confirmed and the club signed, among others, Tony Taylor, Kevin Punter, Amath M'Baye and Brian Qvale, to participate in the Basketball Champions League, which was Virtus's first European competition after ten years. The team reached a record of seven wins in the first seven games of the continental competition, which had never been achieved before. In March 2019, the team signed Mario Chalmers, two-time NBA champion with the Miami Heat.

Canarias
Canarias, playing as Iberostar Tenerife for sponsorship reasons, had another successful BCL season.

Venue

Road to the final

Game details

References

Final
2019
Virtus Bologna
CB 1939 Canarias